The flag of the Community of Portuguese Language Countries (or flag of the CPLP), also known as the Flag of the Lusophony, represents the intergovernmental organization for friendship among Lusophone (Portuguese-speaking) nations where Portuguese is an official language. The Portuguese language countries are home to more than 270 million people located across the globe.

History
The CPLP was formed in 1996 with seven countries: Portugal, Brazil, a former colony in South America, and five former colonies in Africa—Angola, Cape Verde, Guinea-Bissau, Mozambique, and São Tomé and Príncipe. East Timor joined the community in 2002 after regaining independence from Indonesia; Equatorial Guinea joined in 2014. Senegal and Mauritius are associate members.

Symbolism
The flag symbolises the Portuguese-speaking countries' union: having a blue circle, divided into eight equal wavy shapes (the numbers of members of the CPLP) representing the sea (primary bond between the Community), at the center of a white field, in the center of which a small concentrical blue circle was placed representing the union.

External links
CPLP on Flags of the World

Flags of Portugal
 Flag
Flag
Flag
Flag
Flag
Flags of international organizations
Language flags
Community of Portuguese Language Countries
Flag